Each team's roster consisted of at least 15 skaters (forwards and defencemen) and two goaltenders, and at most 22 skaters and three goaltenders. All 16 participating nations, through the confirmation of their respective national associations, had to submit a roster by the first IIHF directorate meeting.

Age and team as of 1 May 2015.

Group A

Austria
A 53-player roster was announced on 6 March 2015 which was trimmed to 26 on 4 April 2015. A 28-player list was released on 21 April 2015.

Head coach: Dan Ratushny

Canada
The first 19 players were announced on 14 April 2015 by Hockey Canada. On 26 April a 21-player list was named.

Head coach: Todd McLellan

Czech Republic
The first 18 players were nominated on 16 March 2015 while the roster was made of 29 players on 11 April 2015. On 24 April 2015 a 28-player squad was published

Head coach: Vladimír Růžička

France
A 49-player roster was named on 12 March 2015. On 28 April 2015 a 25-player list was published.

Head coach: Dave Henderson

Germany
A 30-player roster was announced on 28 March 2015. On 28 April 2015 a 26-player list was published.

Head coach: Pat Cortina

Latvia
A 30-player roster was announced on 23 March 2015 of whom 26 made the cut on 31 March 2015. On 27 April 2015 a 26-player roster was named.

Head coach: Aleksandrs Beļavskis

Sweden
A 22-player roster was announced on 6 April 2015. On 15 April 2015 a 24-player squad was named. On 28 April 2015 a 28-player squad was revealed.

Head coach: Pär Mårts

Switzerland
A 22-player roster was announced on 23 March 2015, while on 3 April 2015 a few changes were made and 25 players were selected. On 18 April 2015 a 26-player roster was named. A 25-player roster was revealed on 28 April 2015.

Head coach: Glen Hanlon

Group B

Belarus
A 27-player roster was announced on 24 March 2015.

Head coach: Dave Lewis

Denmark
Head coach: Janne Karlsson

Finland
A 27-player roster was announced on 7 April 2015. On 27 April 2015 a 25-player squad was named, with the third goalkeeper being announced at a later date. Pekka Rinne was named as the third goalkeeper on 27 April 2015.

Head coach: Kari Jalonen

Norway
A 24-player roster was announced on 29 March 2015. A 25-player squad was revealed on 27 April 2015.

Head coach: Roy Johansen

Russia
A 23-player roster was announced on 5 April 2015.

Head coach: Oleg Znarok

Slovakia
A 20-player roster was announced on 19 March 2015.

Head coach: Vladimír Vůjtek

Slovenia
A 22-player roster was announced on 3 April 2015.

Head coach: Matjaž Kopitar

United States
The roster was announced on 13 April 2015.

Head coach: Todd Richards

References

Rosters
IIHF World Championship rosters